Group B of the 2017 Africa Cup of Nations qualification tournament was one of the thirteen groups to decide the teams which qualified for the 2017 Africa Cup of Nations finals tournament. The group consisted of four teams: DR Congo, Angola, Central African Republic, and Madagascar.

The teams played against each other home-and-away in a round-robin format, between June 2015 and September 2016.

DR Congo, the group winners, qualified for the 2017 Africa Cup of Nations.

Standings

Matches

Goalscorers
3 goals

 Gelson
 Moussa Limane
 Cédric Bakambu

2 goals

 Vianney Mabidé
 Jonathan Bolingi
 Jordan Botaka
 Joël Kimwaki
 Paul-José M'Poku
 Firmin Ndombe Mubele

1 goal

 Fredy
 Gilberto
 Dolly Menga
 Pana
 Junior Gourrier
 Salif Kéïta
 Foxi Kéthévoama
 Eloge Enza Yamissi
 Yannick Bolasie
 Neeskens Kebano
 Elia Meschak
 Carolus Andriamatsinoro
 Faneva Imà Andriatsima
 Fabrice Angio Rakotondraibe
 Pascal Razakanantenaina
 Sarivahy Vombola

Notes

References

External links
Orange Africa Cup Of Nations Qualifiers 2017, CAFonline.com

Group B